Coquihalla Summit (el. ) is a highway summit along the Coquihalla Highway in British Columbia, Canada. It is the highest point on the highway between the cities of Hope and Merritt.

The ascent to the Coquihalla Summit is very steep, especially from the south, and is particularly steep north of the Great Bear snow shed. The pass is named after the Coquihalla River, from which the highway also derives its name.

History
Kw'ikw'iya:la (Coquihalla) in the Halq'emeylem language of the Stó:lō, is a place name meaning "stingy container." It refers to a fishing rock near the mouth of what is now known as the Coquihalla River. This rock is a good platform for spearing salmon. According to Sto;lo oral history, the skw'exweq (water babies or naiads, underwater people) who inhabit a pool close by the rock, would swim out and pull the salmon off the spears, allowing only certain fisherman to catch the salmon.

The Coquihalla Valley has long been a major transportation route from the coast to the interior.  In 1876 the Hope-Nicola Trail was built. The area retains some remnants of the Kettle Valley Railway which travelled this route from early 1900s until 1961. Modern use of the pass began in 1986 after construction of the first phase of the Coquihalla Highway (from Hope to Merritt). Construction of this part of the Coquihalla Highway was spearheaded by Tom Waterland as MLA for Yale-Lillooet. His "conviction that the route provided important benefits and an essential link to B.C.'s Interior... helped to convince reluctant Cabinet members of the necessity of the third route to the Interior". After 10 years in office, Waterland retired from the Cabinet in 1986 a few months after seeing this part of the project through to its completion. Some of the old railroad grade is now part of the Trans-Canada Trail network, including the Othello Tunnels of the Coquihalla River section, which are accessible via exits from the Coquihalla Highway. A series of protected areas were established along the route in 1986.

Explosives, dropped from helicopters, and three days were needed to clear it.

Coquihalla Summit Recreation Area

Coquihalla Summit Recreation Area is a provincial recreation area centred around Coquihalla Summit. It encompasses  of forested mountain slopes stretching from Portia Peak in the southwest to Coquihalla Lakes in the northeast. The recreation area was established on September 4, 1987, with the goal of protecting the transition zone between the wetter coast and drier southern interior regions of the province. It also provides highway travellers opportunities for viewing granite peaks, wildlife and historic features such as the Kettle Valley Railway and old Coquihalla Highway, both of which were earlier routes through the area.

See also
List of mountain passes of the Cascade Range
Kettle River Recreation Area - the only other recreation area in British Columbia

References

External links

BC Ministry of Transportation and Highways Infopage

Canadian Cascades
Mountain passes of the North Cascades
Mountain passes of British Columbia
Provincial parks of British Columbia